Stone Tables (1997) is a historical novel by American writer Orson Scott Card, based on the life of Moses. As with much of Card's other literature, a Christian/Mormon influence is present in this book.

Adaptations
In 1973, Card, in conjunction with Robert Stoddard, wrote a musical adaptation of Stone Tables that was premiered and performed at Brigham Young University.  On October 24, 2008, a revised edition of the musical was premiered at Southern Virginia University.

See also

List of works by Orson Scott Card
 particularly The Women of Genesis series
Orson Scott Card

External links
 About the novel Stone Tables from Card's website

1997 novels
Novels by Orson Scott Card
Historical novels
Cultural depictions of Moses
Novels based on the Bible
Novels set in ancient Israel